The 2009 Chinese Artistic Gymnastics Championships were held from  13 May to 17 May 2009 in Jinan, Shandong.

Men's Event Medal Winners

Women's Event Medal Winners

References

Chinese Artistic Gymnastics Championships
2009 in Chinese sport
Chinese Artistic Gymnastics Championships